This is a list of seasons completed by the Iowa Barnstormers. The Barnstormers are a professional indoor football franchise of the Indoor Football League (IFL), based in Des Moines, Iowa. The team was established in 1995, and the original franchise became the New York Dragons after the 2000 season. Prior to relocating, the Barnstormers competed in ArenaBowl X and ArenaBowl XI and lost both contests. Iowa was awarded a franchise in arenafootball2 (AF2), the AFL's developmental league, assuming the history of the original franchise. The Barnstormers competed in the 2001 season, but ceased operations following that season. After a seven-year period of inactivity, the Barnstormers returned in 2008 after AF2 approved the sale of the team to new ownership.

In 2010, after the AFL resumed operations following a year-long hiatus, the Barnstormers returned to AFL competition. The Barnstormers moved to the IFL for the 2015 season.

References
General
 

Specific

Arena Football League seasons by team
Iowa Barnstormers
Iowa Barnstormers seasons